In geometry, the Miquel configuration is a configuration of eight points and six circles in the Euclidean plane, with four points per circle and three circles through each point.
Its Levi graph is the Rhombic dodecahedral graph, the skeleton of both Rhombic dodecahedron and Bilinski dodecahedron. The configuration is related to Miquel's theorem.

References

Configurations (geometry)